Heydarabad-e Saki (also Romanized as Ḩeydarābād-e Sākī; also known as Ḩeydarābād-e Cheshmeh Barqī and Ḩeydarābād) is a village in Qaleh-ye Mozaffari Rural District, in the Central District of Selseleh County, Lorestan Province, Iran. At the 2006 census, its population was 112, in 23 families.

References 

Towns and villages in Selseleh County